Survival is the fourth studio album by American rock band Grand Funk Railroad, released in April 1971 by Capitol Records. Recorded at Cleveland Recording Company, the album was produced by Terry Knight. Drummer Don Brewer was not happy with the drum sound on the album, due to Knight's insistence of having Brewer cover his drum heads with tea-towels, after seeing Ringo Starr use the technique in the Beatles' film Let It Be (1970).

Track listing 
All tracks written by Mark Farner unless noted.

Side one
"Country Road" – 4:22
"All You've Got Is Money" – 5:16
"Comfort Me" – 6:48
"Feelin' Alright"  – 4:27

Side two
"I Want Freedom" – 6:19
"I Can Feel Him in the Morning"  – 7:15
"Gimme Shelter"  – 6:29

Bonus Tracks – CD release
"I Can't Get Along with Society (Remix)" – 5:41
"Jam (Footstompin' Music)" – 4:40
"Country Road"  – 7:37
"All You've Got is Money"  – 8:18
"Feelin' Alright"  – 5:57

Differences in bonus tracks 
The bonus tracks on the 2002 reissue labeled "Original Version" have extended sections and extra lyrics compared to the tracks as released on the original LP.

"Feelin' Alright" is a different take of the song, as heard by the different inflections in the lead vocal, placement of the instruments in the stereo mix, and musical differences in the playing. Additionally, a third verse is included that is not in the LP version.

"Footstompin' Music" became a staple at Grand Funk Railroad's concerts, having been recorded at the Survival sessions but not included on the original release. It was brought into their next album setlist, E Pluribus Funk (1971), with a slightly different arrangement and without the word "Jam" on its title. The song is featured on the live albums Caught in the Act (1975), Bosnia (1997), and Live: The 1971 Tour (recorded in 1971, released in 2002).

Personnel 

 Mark Farner – vocals, guitar, harmonica, keyboards
 Mel Schacher – bass
 Don Brewer – vocals, drums

LP extras 
The original LP release came with 8x10 photos of each of the three bandmembers, in similar poses as the caveman image of the three from the album cover.

Charts 
Album

Singles

References 

1971 albums
Grand Funk Railroad albums
Albums produced by Terry Knight
Capitol Records albums